Feras Taleb Abu Obeid (born 10 May 1977) is a Jordanian football goalkeeper who played for Jordan in the 2004 Asian Cup. He also played for Al Buqa.

See also
Football in Jordan

References

External links

Jordanian footballers
1977 births
Living people
Association football goalkeepers
Jordan international footballers